Anton Sergeevich Nazarenko (born 24 July 1984) is a Russian badminton player.

Achievements

European Junior Championships 
Boys' doubles

Mixed doubles

BWF International Challenge/Series 
Men's doubles

Mixed doubles

  BWF International Challenge tournament
  BWF International Series tournament
  BWF Future Series tournament

References

External links 
 

1984 births
Living people
Badminton players from Moscow
Russian male badminton players